WOLV (97.7 MHz, "The Wolf") is an FM radio station licensed to Houghton, Michigan, broadcasting a classic hits format. The studios are at 313 E. Montezuma in Houghton, a location it shares with its sister stations, WCCY and WHKB.

The station first went on the air in January 1980 as WHUH. In 1990, the station's call letters were changed to WOLF-FM. In 1994, the call letters were changed to WOLV.

In 2019 was named Michigan Association of Broadcaster's Station of the Year.

References
Michiguide.com - WOLV history

External links

OLV
Classic hits radio stations in the United States
Radio stations established in 1980
1980 establishments in Michigan